Zigmantas Kiaupa (29 June 1942 in Pakiaunis village near Ignalina) is a Lithuanian historian, archivist, and professor. His specialty is political history of the Grand Duchy of Lithuania, history of cities and city dwellers, and study of historical sources.

Important works
Instrukcijos feodalinių valdų administracijai Lietuvoje XVII–XIX a, 1985.
Šiauliai XV–XVIII a.: Lietuvos mažujų miestų raidos problemos (Ph.D thesis), 1993.
Lietuvos istorija iki 1795 m.  (together with J. Kiaupienė and A. Kuncevičius),1995, (reissued in 1998); translated into English as The History of Lithuania before 1795, 2000.
The History of Lithuania, 2000.
Lietuvos valstybės istorija, 2004.

External links
  Short bio and bibliography at Lithuanian History Institute website

1942 births
Living people
20th-century Lithuanian historians
Historians of Lithuania
Vilnius University alumni
Writers from Vilnius
21st-century Lithuanian historians